Octavia Lenora Spencer (born May 25, 1970) is an American actress. She is the recipient of several accolades, including an Academy Award, a British Academy Film Award, a Golden Globe Award, making her the first black actress to receive two consecutive Oscar nominations.

Spencer made her film debut in the 1996 drama A Time to Kill. Following a decade of brief roles in film and television, her breakthrough came in 2011, when she played a maid in 1960s America in The Help, for which she won several awards, including the Academy Award for Best Supporting Actress. For her performance in Ryan Coogler's biopic Fruitvale Station (2013), she won the National Board of Review Award for Best Supporting Actress.

Spencer received further Academy Award nominations for Best Supporting Actress for playing other women in 1960s America, the mathematician Dorothy Vaughan in the biographical drama Hidden Figures (2016), and a cleaning woman in the fantasy drama The Shape of Water (2017). She also appeared in the films Halloween II (2009), Smashed (2012), Snowpiercer (2013), Get on Up (2014), The Divergent Series (201516), Gifted (2017), Instant Family (2018), and Onward (2020); and had starring roles in The Shack (2017), Luce (2019), and Ma (2019).

Spencer also had a recurring role in the CBS sitcom Mom (201315) and a starring role in the Fox teen drama series Red Band Society (201415). She portrays the lead role in the Apple TV+ drama series Truth Be Told (2019–present), and received a nomination for the Primetime Emmy Award for Outstanding Lead Actress for her portrayal of Madam C. J. Walker in the Netflix limited series Self Made (2020). 

As an author, Spencer created the children's book series Randi Rhodes, Ninja Detective. She has published two books in the series, titled The Case of the Time-Capsule Bandit (2013) and The Sweetest Heist in History (2015).

Early life
Octavia Lenora Spencer was born in Montgomery, Alabama, and has six siblings, including sisters Rosa and Areka Spencer. Her mother, Dellsena Spencer (1945–1988), worked as a maid. Her father died when she was thirteen. Spencer graduated from Jefferson Davis High School in 1988. She studied at Auburn University at Montgomery, and graduated from Auburn University, where she majored in English with a double minor in journalism and theater. Spencer has dyslexia.

In December 2021 and 2022, Auburn alumna Spencer bought food for students during finals week.

Career

1996–2009
Spencer worked as an intern on the set of The Long Walk Home, a film starring Whoopi Goldberg. In 1997, she moved to Los Angeles on the advice of her friend Tate Taylor, the future director of The Help, in which Spencer would later star.

Spencer made her film debut as a nurse in Joel Schumacher's A Time to Kill, based on the book by John Grisham. She was originally hired to work on casting, but asked Schumacher if she could audition for a part. Other film credits include: Miss Congeniality 2, Never Been Kissed, Big Momma's House, Bad Santa, Spider-Man, Coach Carter, Win a Date with Tad Hamilton! and Pretty Ugly People. She has made a number of guest appearances on television series, including Raising the Bar, CSI: Crime Scene Investigation, The Big Bang Theory, Wizards of Waverly Place, Grounded for Life, ER, Titus, Becker, 30 Rock and Dharma & Greg, plus a recurring role on the sitcom Mom. She is also known for her starring roles as Serenity Johnson on Comedy Central's Halfway Home, and Constance Grady, the amorous INS caseworker on Ugly Betty.

In 2003, Spencer made her stage debut in Los Angeles, in Del Shores' play, The Trials and Tribulations of a Trailer Trash Housewife, starring opposite veteran actress Beth Grant. It was her first and only play, as, she once explained, she suffers from what she called "intense stage fright". Later that year, she starred opposite Allison Janney in Tate Taylor's short feature Chicken Party.

In 2008, Spencer's brief appearance in Seven Pounds as Kate, Rosario Dawson's home care nurse, garnered her high praise and media attention. In April 2009, Entertainment Weekly listed Spencer as among its "25 Funniest Actresses in Hollywood".

In August 2009, Spencer appeared in Rob Zombie's Halloween II. She also had a role in the American remake of the Danish classic Love at First Hiccup, opposite Scout Taylor-Compton. Spencer starred in the feature film Herpes Boy, alongside Beth Grant, Ahna O'Reilly and Byron Lane. She played the voice of "Minny" on the audio version of novel The Help, by Kathryn Stockett. Later that year, Spencer's short film The Captain was honored by the CICFF as a finalist for the REEL Poetry Award.

2010–2019
In August 2010, Spencer joined Viola Davis, Emma Stone and Bryce Dallas Howard in the period drama film The Help, an adaptation of the novel of the same name. She played the feisty and unflappable maid Minny Jackson. The film was written, produced and directed by Tate Taylor, and produced by Brunson Green, Chris Columbus, Michael Barnathan, and Mark Radcliffe. She won the 2012 Golden Globe Award for Best Supporting Actress – Motion Picture for her work in The Help. On February 12, 2012, Spencer won a BAFTA for Best Supporting Actress for her Performance in The Help, and on February 26 she won the Academy Award for Best Supporting Actress for the same performance; it was her first Oscar nomination and first win. Spencer was given a standing ovation at the ceremony, and was moved to tears during her acceptance speech. In June 2012, Spencer was invited to join the Academy of Motion Picture Arts and Sciences.

In 2013, she appeared alongside Michael B. Jordan in Fruitvale Station, a film chronicling the last day of Oscar Grant, who was killed at a Bay Area Rapid Transit station in 2009. In September 2013, it was announced that she would reunite with The Help director Taylor in the biopic on singer James Brown Get On Up, opposite her The Help co-star Viola Davis. The film was released in 2014. From September 2014 until February 2015, she starred in Steven Spielberg's Fox drama television series Red Band Society.

Spencer co-starred alongside Kevin Costner in the drama film Black or White (2014) and co-starred as Johanna Reyes in the second installment of the Divergent series, The Divergent Series: Insurgent (2015). She reprised the role in The Divergent Series: Allegiant (2016). She voiced Mrs. Otterton in Disney's Zootopia, which marked her animated film debut.

In 2016, she starred alongside Taraji P. Henson and Janelle Monáe in Hidden Figures, a film about African-American mathematicians at NASA who were critical to its success in the 1960s in the Space Race, and who each had careers there. She played mathematician and human computer Dorothy Vaughan. The role garnered her a Golden Globe Award and Screen Actors Guild Award for her performance and earned Spencer a second nomination for the Academy Award for Best Supporting Actress, making her the first black actress to follow up an Oscar victory with another nomination, having previously won for The Help. In honor of Martin Luther King Jr. Day, Spencer bought out a Los Angeles screening of Hidden Figures to treat low-income families that would have been unable to afford to see the film otherwise.

In 2017, Spencer co-starred with Sally Hawkins in Guillermo del Toro's  dark fantasy drama film The Shape of Water, which follows a mute custodian at a high-security government laboratory who befriends a captured humanoid-amphibian creature. The film was screened in the main competition section of the 74th Venice International Film Festival, where it premiered to positive reviews on August 31, 2017, and was awarded the Golden Lion for best film in the competition. It also screened at the 2017 Toronto International Film Festival. Spencer earned Golden Globe and BAFTA Award nominations for her portrayal, while receiving her third Academy Award nomination in the Best Supporting Actress category, making her the first black actress to receive two consecutive Oscar nods in back-to-back years.

In 2018, Spencer has starring roles as a preschool principal in the drama film A Kid Like Jake and a social worker in the comedy film Instant Family. She also executive produced the biographical comedy-drama film Green Book, which went on to receive the Academy Award for Best Picture.

In 2019, she starred as Harriet Wilson, a history teacher who makes an alarming discovery about an all-star student, in the drama film Luce. The film premiered at the 2019 Sundance Film Festival and earned critical acclaim. She then received praise for her starring role as Sue Ann "Ma" Ellington in the psychological horror film Ma, which was directed by frequent collaborator Tate Taylor. For the latter, she received a nomination for the Saturn Award for Best Actress. Also in 2019, Spencer returned to television by executive producing and starring in the Apple TV+ drama series Truth Be Told.

2020–present
In January 2020, Spencer had a voice role as Dab-Dab, an enthusiastic duck with a metal leg, in the fantasy comedy film Dolittle, starring Robert Downey Jr. as the titular character. She also voiced a manticore restaurant owner in the Pixar animated fantasy film Onward, which was released in March 2020 to positive reviews.

Spencer executive produced and starred as Madam C. J. Walker in the Netflix biographical limited series Self Made, which was released on March 20, 2020. For her performance in the series, Spencer received a nomination for the Primetime Emmy Award for Outstanding Lead Actress in a Limited Series or Movie.

Spencer starred alongside Anne Hathaway in Robert Zemeckis's horror comedy The Witches, which released on October 22, 2020. Spencer co-stars with Melissa McCarthy as women who suddenly develop superpowers in the superhero comedy film Thunder Force. She will reunite with her The Help co-star Jessica Chastain for a holiday comedy film.

Filmography

Film

Television

Awards and nominations

Spencer has received three nominations for the Academy Award for Best Supporting Actress, including one win. She is the first African-American actress to receive Academy Award nominations in back-to-back years, the first African-American actress to receive two Academy Award nominations after a win, and the second-most nominated African-American actress to date.

She has also won three Screen Actors Guild Awards, three National Board of Review Awards, two Satellite Awards, two Critics' Choice Movie Awards, a Golden Globe Award, and a BAFTA Award.

See also
 List of actors with two or more Academy Award nominations in acting categories

Footnotes

References

External links

1970 births
20th-century American actresses
21st-century American actresses
Actresses from Montgomery, Alabama
Actresses from Alabama
African-American actresses
African-American history of Alabama
American film actresses
American television actresses
American voice actresses
Auburn University alumni
Auburn University at Montgomery alumni
Audiobook narrators
Best Supporting Actress Academy Award winners
Best Supporting Actress BAFTA Award winners
Best Supporting Actress Golden Globe (film) winners
Living people
Outstanding Performance by a Cast in a Motion Picture Screen Actors Guild Award winners
Outstanding Performance by a Female Actor in a Supporting Role Screen Actors Guild Award winners
20th-century African-American women
20th-century African-American people
21st-century African-American women
Actors with dyslexia